The Memorial Grundmanna I Wizowskiego is a one-day cycling race held in Poland. It was previously part of the UCI Europe Tour as a category 1.2 race. In 2014, it was rated 2.2.

Winners

Notes

References

Cycle races in Poland
1984 establishments in Poland
Recurring sporting events established in 1984
UCI Europe Tour races
Summer events in Poland